Quinton is a surname and a masculine given name.

Quinton may also refer to:

Places

United Kingdom
 Quinton, Birmingham, a western suburb and Birmingham City Council ward
 Quinton, Northamptonshire, a village and civil parish
 Quinton, Warwickshire, a civil parish containing Lower Quinton and Upper Quinton (formerly in Gloucestershire)

United States
 Quinton, Alabama
 Quinton Township, New Jersey
 Quinton (CDP), New Jersey
 Quinton, Oklahoma
 Quinton, Virginia

Elsewhere
 Quinton, Saskatchewan, Canada
 Quinton Point, Anvers Island, Palmer Archipelago, Antarctica

Other uses
 Quinton (musical instrument), 18th-century bowed musical instrument
 Quinton Township School District, a public school district in Salem County, New Jersey, US
 Quinton House School, Upton, Northampton, England
 Quinton, a Modron character in Dungeons and Dragons

See also
 Middle Quinton, a proposed eco-town in Warwickshire, England
 Quentin (disambiguation)
 Quintin, a commune in France